Five Points in Columbia, South Carolina is a shopping, restaurant, and nightlife area that attracts customers from the nearby University of South Carolina and throughout the Columbia metropolitan area.  It is the center for the city's annual St. Patrick’s Day Festival.

It was Columbia's first neighborhood shopping district, named for the intersection of Harden Street, Devine Street and Santee Avenue.  It was home to Columbia's first supermarket (an A & P), first Chinese restaurant (Kester’s Bamboo House), and the first bar in South Carolina to serve a cocktail (the Stage Door, which claimed to sell the state's first legal mixed drink after the South Carolina General Assembly approved the use of minibottles in 1973).

When streetcars were prevalent, Five Points was a hub (rotating circle) for moving between downtown Columbia and the residential area of Shandon.

In 2019, Five Points was added to the National Register of Historic Places.

References

External links 
Five Points Mall : Local area business and community guide, celebrating the 5 Points business community
Five Points Association of Columbia

Geography of Columbia, South Carolina
Shopping districts and streets in the United States
Tourist attractions in Columbia, South Carolina
National Register of Historic Places in Columbia, South Carolina